The broadbanded lanternshark (Etmopterus gracilispinis) is a shark of the family Etmopteridae found in the western and southeast Atlantic, between latitudes 40°N and 45°S, at depths of between 70 and 1,000 m.  Its length is up to 35 cm. Reproduction is presumed to be ovoviviparous.

References

Etmopterus
Fish described in 1968